Austrazenia tusa is a moth of the family Noctuidae first described by Charles Swinhoe in 1902. It is found in Australia.

External links
Australian Faunal Directory

Moths of Australia
Acronictinae
Moths described in 1902